Dokuzyol, historically Uruş, is a village in the Oğuzeli District, Gaziantep Province, Turkey. The village is inhabited by Turkmens of the Barak  and Bozgeyikli tribes as well as Abdals of the Kuyucular tribe.

References

Villages in Oğuzeli District